No-No Boy (2010) is a play written by Ken Narasaki adapted from the novel of the same title by John Okada, originally produced at the Miles Memorial Playhouse in Santa Monica, California, in association with Timescape Arts Group. It is a drama in two acts.  (Each act was approximately 50 minutes in length and there was a 15-minute intermission.)  The play was directed by Alberto Isaac, and received its world premiere on Saturday, March 27, 2010.  (There was a preview on Friday, March 26, 2010 and it closed on Sunday, April 18, 2010.)  The story follows a Japanese American World War II draft resister as he returns home from prison, in 1946.

Play summary 
Set after World War II as Japanese Americans return to the West Coast, the play follows draft resister Ichiro Yamada after he is released from prison and struggles to come to terms with the consequences of his choices, while the rest of the community tries to get back on its feet after a war that has uprooted them all.

Characters 
 Ichiro Yamada: Nisei draft resister
 Pa: Ichiro's father, Issei
 Ma: Ichiro's mother, Issei
 Kenji Kanno: wounded 442 vet
 Emi: wife of enlisted soldier
 Freddie: Ichiro's buddy, also a draft resister
 Eto: veteran
 Taro: Ichiro's younger brother
 Mrs. Kanno: Kenji's mother
 Mr. Kumasaka: friend of the Yamada family
 Jun: veteran, friend of the Kumasaka's
 2A: neighbor of Freddie
 Cop

World premiere company 
Miles Memorial Playhouse, 1130 Lincoln Blvd, Santa Monica, CA 90403; Opened March 27, 2010; Closed April 18, 2010.

Original cast 
(in order of appearance)
 Ichiro – Robert Wu
 Eto / Jun – Chris Tashima
 Taro – Jared Asato
 Pa – Sab Shimono
 Ma – Sharon Omi
 Mr. Kumasaka / Cop – Ken Narasaki
 2A / Mrs. Kanno – Emily Kuroda
 Freddie – John Miyasaki (March 26 - April 12); Mike Hagiwara (April 16–18)
 Kenji – Greg Watanabe
 Emi / Mrs.ka – Keiko Agena
 Understudy for Emi, 2A, Mrs. Kumasaka, Mrs. Kanno - Junko Goda

Setting 
 Seattle, 1946.

Production staff 
 Director – Alberto Isaac
 Choreographer – Michael Hagiwara
 Fight Choreographer – Aaron Pagel
 Set Design – Alan E. Muraoka
 Costume designer – Ken Takemoto
 Lighting designer – Jeremy Pivnick
 Sound Design/Music Composition – Dave Iwataki
 Projection Design – John J. Flynn
 Property Master – Ken Takemoto
 Stage Manager – Darlene Miyakawa

Controversy 
The ending of the play has received criticism due to the uplifting tone of Ken Narasaki's rewrite, compared to Okada's original, bleak ending. By the end of the original novel, Ichiro is walking down a street alone and conflicted, having just seen Freddie, a fellow No-No Boy, die in a car crash while fleeing from a fight with a Nisei veteran. The documentary director Frank Abe describes the stage play's alterations to the plot: "Instead, after a brief knife fight, Freddie escapes. Ichiro goes out dancing — a scene from earlier in the book, with Emi the abandoned wife...Ichiro and Emi kiss. They are going to live happily ever after, doggone it. It's a theatrical moment. It's probably very moving in performance. It's also schmaltz. And It's very wrong." Frank Chin, whose afterword was printed in subsequent editions of "No-No Boy" after having helped republish the novel following Okada's death, was also critical of the rewrite. Chin quipped that, "Car crashes and death are too difficult" to be a part of the Asian American stage, and said of Narasaki's changes, "If you don't like Okada, stay out of his bathroom, bedroom, stay out of his house, get out of his fucking book. Just leave it alone." Chin and Narasaki wrote back and forth, as documented by Chin, with Narasaki of the belief that the deceased Okada would not be so harsh about the changes to his work, and said of Chin that, "You, who were once a life force that helped spawn so many Asian American theater artists have now become a poison determined to kill your fellow artists because they are not you."

Reviews 
 4/1/10 review by Paul Birchall for LA Weekly
 4/16/10 student review by Jennifer Ta for Daily Bruin

See also
List of plays with anti-war themes

References

External links 
 Official Site
 Blog
 The Miles Memorial Playhouse

2010 plays
American plays
Anti-war plays
Asian-American plays
Internment of Japanese Americans
Plays based on novels
Seattle in fiction
Plays set in Washington (state)